Rabbi Bension Kohen or haKohen (born in Djerba, Tunisia, died 1999 in Jerusalem) was a writer of literature on Hebrew grammar and literature. He was the author of Sfath Emeth, a work on the pronunciation of the Hebrew alphabet.

Lineage 
In the introduction to his work, Kohen provides a purported lineage going back over a dozen generations of kohanim born at Djerba. Among his claimed  patrilineal ancestors are Rabbi  (d. 1848), himself an author of multiple works on Hebrew grammar. Citing a similar lineage table from Heritage of Yehoyada HaKohen, Kohen claims to trace the family back to Yitzchak HaKohen the Elder, who had emigrated from Israel to Djerba at the Second Temple Destruction.

Sfath Emeth 
Kohen's flagship work, the Sfath Emeth, was first printed in Jerusalem in 1987. The work purports to present the "authentic" pronunciation of the 22 Hebrew letters based on Geonic literature and the work of Hebrew grammarians such as Rav Saadya Gaon, Rabbi Yitzhak ben Shlomo Yisraeli and the Radak.

Table of pronunciation 
Rabbi Kohen's research led him to produce a table of pronunciation. The table has been published (with minor variations than what is listed below) on page 150 of Sfath Emeth:

See also 
El Ghriba synagogue

References 

20th-century Tunisian rabbis
Kohanim writers of Rabbinic literature
Year of birth uncertain
Jewish grammarians
Linguists of Hebrew
Grammarians of Hebrew
People from Djerba
Israeli Orthodox rabbis
Tunisian emigrants to Israel
1999 deaths